Manuel Emilio Palacios Murillo (born 13 February 1993) is a Colombian professional footballer who  is a free agent.

Club career
Born in Quibdó, Palacios started competing at Patriotas F.C., in the Colombian first tier. After nearly fifty league appearances in two seasons, the 21-year-old made his first move abroad, and joined  Atlético CP, in the Portuguese Segunda Liga, on 19 July 2014, as a free player.

He made his debut on 31 August 2014 against C.D. Trofense., adding over thirty caps throughout his first season, seeing the club relegated.

In 2019, Palacios joined FC Anyang in the Korean K League 2 on loan from Atlético Huila. After a great season at FC Anyang, Palacio was transferred to K League 1 giants Pohang Steelers for the 2020–2021 season.

In 2022 March, after playing for 1 match and scoring 1 goal for Pohang Steelers, he moved to Seongnam FC.

References

External links

1993 births
Living people
Sportspeople from Chocó Department
Colombian footballers
Association football forwards
Categoría Primera A players
Liga Portugal 2 players
K League 2 players
K League 1 players
Patriotas Boyacá footballers
Atlético Clube de Portugal players
Real S.C. players
Alianza Petrolera players
Atlético Huila footballers
FC Anyang players
Pohang Steelers players
Seongnam FC players
Colombian expatriate footballers
Expatriate footballers in Portugal
Expatriate footballers in South Korea
Colombian expatriate sportspeople in Portugal
Colombian expatriate sportspeople in South Korea